Hugo Miguel Grilo Francisco (born 28 July 1986), simply known as Hugo Grilo, is a Portuguese footballer who plays for Oriental as a defender.

Club career
A product of Benfica's youth academy, he failed to break into the first team. Instead he had to be contended with a small stint with Benfica B between 2004 and 2005. After being released by the club he joined Operário in 2005. Though he struggled in his first season, he established himself as a first team starter in 2006. He made more than 25 appearances in each of the following seasons till 2011, when he left the club.

In 2011, he joined Oriental. He made 28 appearances in his first season with the club.

References

External links

1986 births
Living people
People from Odivelas
Association football defenders
Portuguese footballers
Liga Portugal 2 players
Portugal youth international footballers
S.L. Benfica B players
Clube Oriental de Lisboa players
Sportspeople from Lisbon District